Waltz Darling is the fourth studio album by Malcolm McLaren (his only with The Bootzilla Orchestra), released in 1989. The album spawned several popular singles, including "Deep in Vogue" a collaboration with Willi Ninja, best known for his appearance in the documentary film Paris Is Burning, which introduced vogue style of dance to the mainstream. Another single, "House of the Blue Danube" was used in the trailer for the 1990 film, Teenage Mutant Ninja Turtles.

Four singles from the album reached the UK Singles Chart: "Waltz Darling" (#31), "Something's Jumpin' in Your Shirt" (#29), "House of the Blue Danube" (#73) and "Deep in Vogue" (#83).

Track listing

Personnel
 "Bootsy" Collins – production (tracks 2, 4 and 8)
 Maz Kessler – production (tracks 2 and 8)
 Robby Kilgore – production (tracks 2 and 8)
 David LeBolt – production (tracks 3 and 5)
 Malcolm McLaren – production
 Phil Ramone – production
 Andy Richards – production (track 1)
 David A. Stewart – production (track 7)
 Mark Moore and William Orbit – additional production and remix (track 5)
 Ben Grosse – recording (Detroit)
 Andy Richards – recording (London)
 Lord Frederick Leighton – front cover painting: Flaming June
 The Leisure Process – sleeve design
 Jay Healy – mixing
 Kevin Davies – photography
 Robin Derrick – photography

Charts

References

Malcolm McLaren albums
1989 albums
Epic Records albums